Ronen Shapira is a former Israeli footballer who is mostly known for playing in the early 1990s in Maccabi Netanya.

He made his debut in the senior side of Hapoel Hadera while only 15 years old.

Honours
Toto Cup (Artzit):
Winner (2): 1985–86, 1988–89

References

1967 births
Living people
Israeli Jews
Israeli footballers
Hapoel Hadera F.C. players
Maccabi Netanya F.C. players
Liga Leumit players
Footballers from Hadera
Association footballers not categorized by position